Ehle may refer to:

 Ehle (river), in Saxony-Anhalt, Germany
 Airport code for Lelystad Airport in The Netherlands
 Ehle House Site, an archaeological site at Nelliston in Montgomery County, New York
 Peter Ehle House, a historic home located at Nelliston in Montgomery County, New York

People with that surname
 John Walter Ehle (1873–1927), Fireman First Class serving in the United States Navy during the Spanish–American War
 John Ehle (1925–2018), U.S. writer
 Jennifer Ehle (born 1969), British-U.S. actress, daughter of John Ehle
 Ricardo Ehle (born 1984), Brazilian footballer